Miyakea lushanus is a moth in the family Crambidae. It was described by Inoue in 1989. It is found in Taiwan.

References

Crambini
Moths described in 1989
Moths of Taiwan